Brian Jenkins may refer to:

Brian Jenkins (politician) (born 1942), British Labour Party politician, MP for Tamworth
Brian Jenkins (American football) (born 1971), college football coach at Bethune-Cookman University
Brian Jenkins (footballer) (born 1935), Welsh footballer
Brian Jenkins (swimmer) (born 1943), British Olympic swimmer
Brian Michael Jenkins (born 1942), U.S. terrorism expert
Bryan Jenkins, Australian chief executive
Brian Garton Jenkins, Lord Mayor of London, President of the UK Charities Aid Foundation, Deputy Chairman Barclays Bank PLC